Northwich was a constituency in Cheshire which returned one Member of Parliament (MP)  to the House of Commons of the Parliament of the United Kingdom from 1885 until it was abolished for the 1983 general election.

History 
Northwich was first created as one of eight single-member divisions of Cheshire under the Redistribution of Seats Act 1885.

It was abolished following the reorganisation of local authorities in 1974 by the Third Periodic Review of Westminster constituencies for the 1983 general election, when it was divided roughly equally between the re-established constituency of Eddisbury and the new constituency of Tatton.

Boundaries 
1885–1918: The Sessional Division of Runcorn, and parts of the Sessional Divisions of Eddisbury, Leftwich and Northwich.

Comprised the towns of Runcorn, Northwich, Winsford and Middlewich, and surrounding rural areas.

1918–1950: The Urban Districts of Middlewich, Northwich, Runcorn, Sandbach and Winsford, and parts of the Rural Districts of Congleton, Northwich and Runcorn.

Sandbach transferred from Crewe.

1950–1955: The Urban Districts of Middlewich, Northwich and Winsford, and the Rural Districts of Northwich and Tarvin.

Gained the Rural District of Tarvin from the additional parts of the Rural District of Northwich from the abolished constituency of Eddisbury. Sandbach and the part of the Rural District of Congleton transferred to Knutsford, and Runcorn (including the part of the rural district thereof) transferred to the new constituency of Runcorn.

1955–1983: The Urban District of Northwich, and parts of the Rural Districts of Northwich and Tarvin.

Middlewich, Winsford, the southern part of the Rural District of Tarvin and a small part of the Rural District of Northwich transferred to the new constituency of Nantwich.

From 1 April 1974 until the constituency was abolished at the next boundary review which came into effect for the 1983 general election, the constituency was primarily situated in the newly formed District of Vale Royal, but its boundaries were unchanged.

On abolition, Northwich and eastern areas were included in the new constituency of Tatton. Cuddington, Weaverham and western areas included in the re-established constituency of Eddisbury.

Members of Parliament

Elections

Elections in the 1880s 

Verdin's death caused a by-election.

Elections in the 1890s

Elections in the 1900s

Elections in the 1910s 

General Election 1914–15:

Another General Election was required to take place before the end of 1915. The political parties had been making preparations for an election to take place from 1914 and by the end of this year, the following candidates had been selected; 
Liberal:  John Brunner
Unionist: Julius John Jersey de Knoop

Elections in the 1920s

Elections in the 1930s

Elections in the 1940s 
General Election 1939–40:

Another General Election was required to take place before the end of 1940. The political parties had been making preparations for an election to take place from 1939 and by the end of this year, the following candidates had been selected; 
Conservative: John Foster
Labour: Robert Chorley
Liberal: Felix Brunner

Elections in the 1950s

Elections in the 1960s

Elections in the 1970s

See also

 History of parliamentary constituencies and boundaries in Cheshire

References

Parliamentary constituencies in Cheshire (historic)
Constituencies of the Parliament of the United Kingdom established in 1885
Constituencies of the Parliament of the United Kingdom disestablished in 1983
Northwich